Passamaquoddy Bay is an inlet of the Bay of Fundy, between the U.S. state of Maine and the Canadian province of New Brunswick, at the mouth of the St. Croix River. Most of the bay lies within Canada, with its western shore bounded by Washington County, Maine.  The southernmost point is formed by West Quoddy Head on the U.S. mainland in Lubec, Maine; and runs northeasterly through Campobello Island, New Brunswick, engulfing Deer Island, New Brunswick, to the New Brunswick mainland head at L'Etete, New Brunswick in Charlotte County, New Brunswick.

Overview 

The exact demarcation of the border in Passamaquoddy Bay was a long-standing issue between the United States and Britain/Canada. Already the Treaty of Ghent, ending the War of 1812, included a provision for the appointment of "commissioners to divide the islands of Passamaquoddy Bay between the United States and Great Britain" (see John Holmes). Nevertheless, confusions and ambiguities on this issue persisted.

The southern boundaries of the bay are sometimes confused since Deer Island sections off the large open waters of the bay; however, the terminology of the Passamaquoddy Bay Treaty of 1910 specifies that Passamaquoddy Bay runs south of Treat Island (one of the islands that now comprise the city of Eastport, Maine), between Campobello Island and Lubec, Maine:

"Now, therefore, upon the evidence and arguments so presented, and after taking into consideration all actions, of the respective Governments and of their representatives authorized in that behalf and of the local governments on either side of the line, whether prior or subsequent to such treaties and award, tending to aid in the interpretation thereof, the High Contracting Parties hereby agree that the location of the international boundary line between the United States and the Dominion of Canada from a point in Passamaquoddy Bay accurately defined in the Treaty between Great Britain and the United States of April 11, 1908, as, lying between Treat Island and Friar Head, and extending thence through Passamaquoddy Bay and to, the middle of Grand Manan Channel, shall run in a series of seven connected straight lines for the distances and in the directions as follows."

The largest community on Passamaquoddy Bay proper is St. Andrews, New Brunswick, but the twin communities of Calais-St. Stephen are sometimes included, despite being located on the St. Croix River. The city of Eastport, Maine lies between Passamaquoddy Bay and Cobscook Bay, to the city's west.  The narrow passage between Maine and Deer Island is known as Western Passage. The passage between Eastport, Maine, and Friar Bay, Campobello Island, is known as Friar Roads.

The three entrances into Passamaquoddy Bay from the Bay of Fundy are Letete Passage northeast of Deer Island, Head Harbour Passage to the southeast of Deer Island and northwest of Campobello Island, and Quoddy Narrows, between southern Lubec, Maine, and southern Campobello Island. Running north from West Quoddy Head in Lubec, the passages known as Quoddy Narrows, Lubec Channel, Lubec Narrows, Friar Roads, and Western Passage also host the International Boundary between Canada and the United States.

The Head Harbour Passage is the deepwater entry to the Bay. The US and Canadian governments agree that the passage is Canadian. The US government believes that it is a territorial sea in which international law gives commercial vessels a right of passage. The Canadian government believes that it can regulate passage and is considering doing so to prevent the use by supertankers carrying cargo to liquified natural gas plants proposed for the American coast of the bay.

Smuggling 
After the American Revolution, Passamaquoddy Bay was the scene of a thriving smuggling trade.  Smuggling peaked in 1808 during Jefferson's Embargo, when smugglers illegally moved tens of thousands of barrels of American flour from American territory into New Brunswick.  During the War of 1812, a thriving illicit trade in British manufactured goods existed.  After the War of 1812, the primary smuggled good was gypsum from Nova Scotia, which was usually deposited directly into American vessels on or near the border.  Smuggling was winked at by both officials and locals in the region, who discouraged outside intervention by British or American authorities who wanted to stop or control it.

See also 
 Old Sow Whirlpool

Further reading 
 Joshua M. Smith. Borderland Smuggling: Patriots, Loyalists and Illicit Trade in the Northeast, 1783–1820. Gainesville: University Press of Florida, 2006.

External links 

 The Tides Institute, Eastport Maine
 Information and resources about Passamaquoddy Bay 
 An online directory to Charlotte County, Passamaquoddy Bay
 Save Passamaquoddy Bay 3-Nation Alliance
 Old Sow Whirlpool, in Passamaquoddy Bay
 review of the Half Moon cove Tidal Power Project in Perry/Eastport Maine
 Quoddy Loop—Tourism information for communities in Maine and New Brunswick surrounding Passamaquoddy Bay

Bays of New Brunswick
Bays of Maine
Bays of Washington County, Maine
Canada–United States border
Landforms of Charlotte County, New Brunswick